Royal Air Force Shrewton or more simply RAF Shrewton is a former Royal Air Force satellite airfield located in Wiltshire, England.

The following units were here at some point:
 No. 1 Service Flying Training School RAF
 No. 15 Service Flying Training School RAF
 No. 43 Operational Training Unit RAF
 No. 225 Squadron RAF
 Glider Exercise Squadron RAF
 Heavy Glider Conversion Unit RAF
 Operational and Refresher Training Unit RAF

Current use

The site is currently farmland.

References

Shrewton